Diptychophora incisalis is a moth in the family Crambidae. It was described by Harrison Gray Dyar Jr. in 1925. It is found in Mexico.

References

Diptychophorini
Moths described in 1925